Stanisław Pastecki (12 November 1907 in Warsaw – 24 February 1988 in Alhambra, California) was a Polish ice hockey player who competed in the 1928 Winter Olympics.

In 1928 he participated with the Polish ice hockey team in the Olympic tournament.

External links
 profile 
 Stanisław Pastecki's profile at Sports Reference.com

1907 births
1988 deaths
Olympic ice hockey players of Poland
Ice hockey players at the 1928 Winter Olympics
Sportspeople from Warsaw
People from Warsaw Governorate
Polish emigrants to the United States